The 156th Airlift Squadron (156 AS) is a unit of the North Carolina Air National Guard 145th Airlift Wing. It is assigned to Charlotte Air National Guard Base, North Carolina and is equipped with the Boeing C-17 Globemaster III aircraft.

History

World War II
Organized and trained in the Northeast United States by First Air Force.  During training was part of the air defense of the northeast, being attached to the New York and Boston Fighter Wings.

The squadron flew P-47 Thunderbolts until they were replaced by P-51 Mustangs in November 1944.

From October 1943 until January 1944, operated as escort for B-17 Flying Fortress/B-24 Liberator bombers that attacked such objectives as industrial areas, missile sites, airfields, and communications.

Fighters from the 461st engaged primarily in bombing and strafing missions after 3 January 1944, with its targets including U-boat installations, barges, shipyards, aerodromes, hangars, marshalling yards, locomotives, trucks, oil facilities, flak towers, and radar stations. Bombed and strafed in the Arnhem, Netherlands area on 17, 18, and 23 September 1944 to neutralize enemy gun emplacements providing support to Allied ground forces during Operation Market-Garden.  In early 1945, the squadron's P-51 Mustangs clashed with German Me 262 jet aircraft. The squadron flew its last combat mission, escorting B-17's dropping propaganda leaflets, on 7 May 1945.

Remained in the United Kingdom during the balance of 1945, most personnel were demobilized and returned to the United States, with aircraft being sent to storage facilities in the UK.  The squadron was administratively inactivated at Camp Kilmer New Jersey on 10 November 1945 without personnel or equipment.

North Carolina Air National Guard
The unit designation was transferred to the North Carolina Air National Guard in May 1946, being re-designated as the 156th Fighter Squadron.  It was organized at Morris Field, near Charlotte, a former Third Air Force Army Airfield during World War II.  Equipped with F-47D Thunderbolts, it was activated on 15 March 1948 by the NC Air National Guard, its gaining organization being Fourteenth Air Force, Continental Air Command.

The 156th performed normal peacetime training operations, was re-equipped with F-51 Mustangs in 1949. As a result of the Korean War, the squadron was federalized and placed on active duty, 10 October 1950.  Assigned to Strategic Air Command, it was assigned to the Kentucky ANG 123d Fighter-Bomber Wing.   After a training period at Godman AFB with F-84E Thunderjets, the wing was deployed to RAF Manston, England where it replaced the 12th Fighter-Escort Wing which had been returned to the United States.   In England, the unit provided fighter escorts for SAC's rotational B-50 Superfortress bombardment wings which operated from several USAF-controlled bases in the UK.  In July 1952 the squadron returned to the United States and was returned to state control, leaving its aircraft and equipment in England.

Upon return to Charlotte, the 156th returned to operating propeller-driven F-51 Mustangs, operating them until their retirement in 1955, being operationally gained by Tactical Air Command.   Was transferred to Air Defense Command (ADC) in mid-1955, and re-equipped with F-86A Sabre day interceptors.  The squadron was given an air defense mission over North and South Carolina as part of the ADC 35th Air Division, Dobbins AFB, Georgia.  In July 1957, the squadron was expanded to a group-level, with the establishment of the 145th Fighter-Interceptor Group.  The 156th was assigned as a subordinate unit to the new group. In 1959 was upgraded to the day/night/all-weather F-86L Sabre Interceptor.

In February 1961, was reassigned to the Military Air Transport Service Eastern Transport Air Force (EASTAF), at McGuire AFB, New Jersey.  Was re-designated as the 156th Aeromedical Transport Squadron.  Equipped with C-119 Flying Boxcars equipped for medical transport, the squadron performed evacuations of transport of critically ill military personnel (and dependents) to military medical facilities for treatment.  Re-equipped with C-121 Constellations in 1964, performed passenger transport missions for MATS both domestically and to the Caribbean and Europe for EASTAF.  Was transferred to the new Military Airlift Command 21st Air Force when MATS was reorganized in 1966.

Was transferred back to Tactical Air Command control in 1971, being equipped with early-model C-130B Hercules tactical airlifters, being given a theater airlift and troop carrier mission as part of Ninth Air Force.  Celebrated 25 years of service in 1973, winning 1st place in worldwide airlift competition.

In January 1974, transferred to Military Airlift Command, Twenty-First Air Force, later that year assisted in rescue of 10 lives of the Eastern Air Lines Flight 212 crash at Charlotte on 11 September.  In 1985, the units mission was expanded by the addition of the Modular Airborne FireFighting System (MAFFS) capability added to the C-130s for aerial firefighting.  Other awards won were the 1986 Volant Rodeo competition as world's best airlift crew and plane and 1987 Spaatz Trophy for best flying unit in the Air National Guard.

During the 1991 Persian Gulf Conflict, the squadron's 56th Aeromedical Evacuation Flight was activated and deployed to Saudi Arabia, participating in Operation Desert Storm.  The squadron also achieved 150,000 hours of safe flying.

Was reassigned to Air Mobility Command in 1992. and helped evacuate hospital patients in South Florida after Hurricane Andrew in late August. Upgraded to C-130H Hercules in 1993.

Celebrated 50th anniversary in 1998, received an Excellent" on Operational Readiness Inspection (ORI), and achieved 176,879 accident free flying hours.  After Hurricane Floyd in 1999, the squadron flew 33,000 cases of food rations in 3 C-130s to flood victims and erected a tent city for 80 people near Wilmington's airport.  Additional hurricane relief took place in 2005 when the 196th was the first airlift squadron on site in response to Hurricane Katrina Relief support.

In July 2012, four members of the squadron died as their C-130 firefighting plane crashed during firefighting efforts in South Dakota. They were: Lt. Col. Paul K. Mikeal, 42, and Maj. Joseph M. McCormick, 36, both pilots; Maj. Ryan S. David, 35, a navigator; and Senior Master Sgt. Robert S. Cannon, 50, a flight engineer.

The squadron is scheduled to commence trading in its C-130H Hercules and receive the C-17A Globemaster III in the fourth quarter of 2017.

Lineage

 Constituted 360th Fighter Squadron on 8 December 1942
 Activated on 12 December 1942
 Inactivated on 11 November 1945
 Re-designated: 156th Fighter Squadron and allocated to the North Carolina ANG on 24 May 1946
 Extended federal recognition on 15 March 1948
 Re-designated: 156th Fighter-Bomber Squadron on 10 October 1950
 Federalized and placed on active duty, 10 October 1950
 Released from active duty and returned to North Carolina state control, 10 July 1952
 Re-designated: 156th Fighter-Interceptor Squadron on 1 July 1955
 Re-designated: 156th Aeromedical Transport Squadron on 1 February 1961
 Re-designated: 156th Air Transport Squadron on 25 January 1964
 Re-designated: 156th Military Airlift Squadron on 1 January 1966
 Re-designated: 156th Tactical Airlift Squadron on 15 May 1971
 Re-designated: 156th Airlift Squadron on 15 March 1992

Assignments
 356th Fighter Group, 12 December 1942 – 11 November 1945
 54th Fighter Wing, 15 March 1948
 123d Fighter-Bomber Wing, 10 October 1950
 116th Fighter-Interceptor Group, 10 July 1952
 116th Fighter-Bomber Group, 1 December 1952
 116th Fighter Group (Air Defense), 1 July 1955
 145th Fighter-Interceptor Group, 1 July 1957
 145th Aeromedical Transport Group, 1 February 1961
 145th Air Transport Group (Heavy), 25 January 1964
 145th Military Airlift Group, 1 January 1966
 145th Tactical Airlift Group, 15 May 1971
 145th Airlift Group, 15 March 1992
 145th Operations Group, 1 October 1995 – Present

Stations

 Westover Field, Massachusetts, 12 December 1942
 Groton Army Airfield, Connecticut, 9 March 1943
 Grenier Field, New Hampshire, 6 Jul-15 Aug 1943
 RAF Goxhill (AAF-345), England, 26 August 1943
 RAF Martlesham Heath (AAF-369), England, c. 10 Oct 1943 – 27 Oct 1945

 Camp Kilmer, New Jersey, 10–11 Nov 1945
 Morris Field (later Douglas IAP, Charlotte Air National Guard Base), North Carolina, 15 Mar 1948–Present
 Operated from: Godman AFB, Kentucky, 20 October 1950
 Operated from: RAF Manston, England, Nov 1951-10 Jul 1952

Aircraft

 P-47 Thunderbolt, 1943–1944
 P-51 Mustang, 1944–1945
 F-47D Thunderbolt, 1948–1949
 F-51D Mustang, 1949–1950; 1952–1955
 F-84 Thunderjet, 1950–1952
 F-86A Sabre, 1955–1957

 F-86E Sabre, 1957–1959
 F-86L Sabre Interceptor, 1959–1961
 C-119C Flying Boxcar, 1961–1962
 C-121 Constellation, 1962–1971
 C-130 Hercules, 1971–2017
 C-17 Globemaster III, 2018–present

Notes

Further reading
 
 Rogers, B. (2006). United States Air Force Unit Designations Since 1978.

External links
http://www.145aw.ang.af.mil/
 156th Airlift Squadron lineage and history
 AF Portal – 156th Weather Flight

156
Squadrons of the United States Air National Guard
Military units and formations established in 1992
Military units and formations in North Carolina